Charlotte Checkers is an American Hockey League team.

Charlotte Checkers may also refer to:

Charlotte Checkers (1956–1977), a defunct team in the Eastern Hockey League and Southern Hockey League, 1956–1977
Charlotte Checkers (1993–2010), a defunct team in the ECHL, 1993–2010

See also  
 Checkers (disambiguation)

Charlotte Checkers